The 1924–25 Prima Divisione season in association football was won by Bologna.

Northern League

Regular season
Derthona and Reggiana had been promoted from the Second Division. AC Mantova was added as guest after a referees scandal they had suffered.

Group A

Classification

Results table

Group B

Classification

Results table

Tie-breaker
Played on August 30, 1925, in Milan.

Spal relegated to the second division, while Mantova qualified to the qualification play-off.

Legnano, Mantova, Novese and Como were enlisted to participate in the qualification round, but Novese and Como retired, letting Legnano and Mantova to maintain their places in the Italian First Division.

Finals

Because of the sole points were considered by the championship regulations, with no relevance to the aggregation of goals, a tie-break was needed.

Tie-breakers

Bologna qualified for the National Finals.

Southern League

The Southern League was a separate amatorial league, still divided in five regions. The winner were Alba Rome.

National Finals
1st leg: 16 Aug 1925, *2nd leg: 23 Aug 1925

Top goalscorers

References and sources
Almanacco Illustrato del Calcio - La Storia 1898-2004, Panini Edizioni, Modena, September 2005
'' Hussain Pakzad Bologna Football Club 1924-1925

Footnotes

Serie A seasons
Italy
Prima